Ahmed Elmaghraby (born April 26, 1968) is a former field hockey forward who finished twelfth with the United States men's national team at the 1996 Summer Olympics in Atlanta, Georgia.

References

External links
 
 USA Field Hockey

1968 births
Living people
Egyptian emigrants to the United States
American male field hockey players
Olympic field hockey players of the United States
Field hockey players at the 1996 Summer Olympics